Karpovskoye is a rural locality (a village) in Kharovskoye Rural Settlement, Kharovsky District, Vologda Oblast, Russia. The population was 10 as of 2002.

Geography 
Karpovskoye is located 19 km southwest of Kharovsk (the district's administrative centre) by road. Volchikha is the nearest rural locality.

References 

Rural localities in Kharovsky District